Euclid and His Modern Rivals is a mathematical book published in 1879 by the English mathematician Charles Lutwidge Dodgson (1832–1898), better known under his literary pseudonym "Lewis Carroll". It considers the pedagogic merit of thirteen contemporary geometry textbooks, demonstrating how each in turn is either inferior to or functionally identical to Euclid's Elements.

In it Dodgson supports using Euclid's geometry textbook The Elements as the geometry textbook in schools against more modern geometry textbooks that were replacing it, advocated by the Association for the Improvement of Geometrical Teaching, satirized in the book as the "Association for the Improvement of Things in General".  Euclid's ghost returns in the play to defend his book against its modern rivals and tries to demonstrate how all of them are inferior to his book.

Despite its scholarly subject and content, the work takes the form of a whimsical dialogue, principally between a mathematician named Minos (taken from Minos, judge of the underworld in Greek mythology) and a "devil's advocate" named Professor Niemand (German for 'nobody') who represents the "Modern Rivals" of the title.

A quote from the preface of this book was used in the first official Wikipedia logo, which was kept in use for eight months, during the course of 2001. Due to the fisheye effect, only part of the text can be read:

References

External links 
 Euclid and His Modern Rivals: Scanned book at the Internet Archive
 Euclid and His Modern Rivals in Historical Math Monographs, Cornell University, 2nd edition from 1885 

1879 non-fiction books
Mathematics books
Works by Lewis Carroll
1879 in science